Rick Meints is a game designer who has worked primarily on role-playing games.

Career
In the 1990s, American expatriate Rick Meints was a member of the Reaching Moon Megacorp, the British fan publisher that was the center of Glorantha culture at the time. Meints was one of the staff on the leading Glorantha fanzine Tales of the Reaching Moon (1989-2002), published by Reaching Moon Megacorp. The Megacorp also published Meints's book on collecting Gloranthan publications, The Meints Index to Glorantha (1996, 1999). In 1998 Meints and Colin Phillips founded Moon Design Publications, the publisher of HeroQuest.

In July 2015, as part of an announcement by Greg Stafford that Moon Design Publications had joined the ownership group of his iconic game company Chaosium, Meints formally became president of Chaosium with Stafford becoming chair of the board of directors.

References

External links
 

Living people
Role-playing game designers
Year of birth missing (living people)